Dimas Camilo Cortés (born October 22, 1989 in Uranden, Michoacán) is a Mexican sprint canoer who competed in the late 2000s. At the 2008 Summer Olympics in Beijing, he was eliminated in the semifinals of both the C-2 500 m and the C-2 1000 m events. He is of Purepecha indigenous descent.

References

Sports-Reference.com profile

1989 births
Canoeists at the 2008 Summer Olympics
Living people
Mexican male canoeists
Sportspeople from Michoacán
Olympic canoeists of Mexico
Mexican people of Purépecha descent
21st-century Mexican people